The 1890–91 FAW Welsh Cup was the 14th edition of the annual knockout tournament for competitive football teams in Wales. The competition was won by Shrewsbury Town.

First round

Second round

Third round

Semi-final

Final

References

Welsh Cup seasons
Welsh Cup
Cup